Aldin Aganovic (born 8 December 2000) is an Austrian footballer who plays as a midfielder for Austrian club .

References

External links

Living people
2000 births
Austrian footballers
Association football midfielders
FC Liefering players
2. Liga (Austria) players
Austria youth international footballers